Kid, Kids, KIDS, and K.I.D.S. may refer to:

Common meanings 
 Colloquial term for a child or other young person
 Also for a parent's offspring regardless of age
 Engage in joking
 Young goat
 The goat meat of young goats
 Kidskin, leather from young goats

Entertainment

Performers
 K.I.D (band), Canadian indie rock band
 K.I.D. (musician), a disco project by Geoff Bastow
 Kid 'n Play, American hip-hop duo from New York
 Kid Capri (born 1967), American DJ and rapper
 Kid Carpet, musician from Bristol, UK
 Kid Crème (born 1974), house music producer and DJ
 Kid Cudi (born 1984), American rapper Scott Ramon Seguro Mescudi
 Kid Jensen (born 1950; David Jensen), Canadian-British radio DJ
 Kid Ory (1886–1973), American jazz trombonist and bandleader
 Kid Rock (born 1971), American singer Robert James Ritchie
 Kid Creole (born 1950), American musician August Darnell, leader of Kid Creole and the Coconuts
 The Kid Laroi (born 2003), Australian rapper and singer-songwriter Charlton Howard

Albums
 K.I.D.S. (album), by Mac Miller, 2010
 K.I.D.S. (EP), by Tiny Masters of Today, 2006
 Kids (Noga Erez album), 2021
 Kids: Live at Dizzy's Club Coca-Cola, by Hank Jones and Joe Lovano, 2007
 Kids, by the Midnight, 2018

Songs
 "Kid" (Peter Andre song), a 2014 song
 "Kid" (Pretenders song), 1979
 "Kid", a song by Green Apple Quick Step
 "Kids" (MGMT song), 2008
 "Kids" (OneRepublic song), 2016
 "Kids" (Style of Eye song), 2013
 "Kids" (Robbie Williams and Kylie Minogue song), 2000
 "Kids", a song by Dev from the 2014 EP Bittersweet July
 "Kids", a song from the 1960 musical Bye Bye Birdie
 "Kids", a song by Ben Rector from the 2018 album Magic

Film and television
 Kid (2012 film), a Belgian film
 Kid (1990 film), an American thriller starring C. Thomas Howell
 Kids (film), a 1995 American drama directed by Larry Clark
 Kids Channel, channel in MNC Channel
 PBS Kids, a brand for children's programming on the US Public Broadcasting Service

Characters 
 Kid Sampson, in the novel Catch-22 by Joseph Heller
 Kid, in the 1978 film Jubilee played by Adam Ant
 Ward "Kid Galahad" Guisenberry, in the 1937 film Kid Galahad
 Kid (Chrono Cross), in the PlayStation role-playing game Chrono Cross
 Kid Flash, name of several DC Comics characters
 Eustass 'Captain' Kid, in the manga One Piece
 Kaito Kid ("Phantom Thief Kid"), in the manga Magic Kaito
 Death the Kid, commonly referred to as Kid, in the manga Soul Eater
 Kid, in Bastion, an Xbox 360 Arcade/PC game
 Kid, in Jak II video game

Radio
 KID (AM), a defunct radio station (590 AM) formerly licensed to serve Idaho Falls, Idaho, United States
 KWFI-FM, a radio station (96.1 FM) licensed to serve Aberdeen, Idaho, which held the call sign KID-FM from 1965 to 1989 and from 1992 to 2018
 KIDS (FM) (88.1 FM), a radio station licensed to Grants, New Mexico, U.S.

Science and technology 
 Kid (templating language), a template engine for XML-based vocabularies written in Python
 KID (Kindle Imagine Develop), a Japanese game company
 Aquilair Kid, a French ultralight trike design
 Kinetic inductance detector, a type of superconducting photon detector
 KIDS (disease), Koala Immune Deficiency Syndrome
 .kid and .kids, Proposed top-level domains for websites intended for children
 KID, a portion of a p300/CBP-related protein

People
 Kid (nickname), a list of people with the nickname or ring name
 Kid Chan (born 1978), international wedding photojournalist from Malaysia

Other uses 
 County Kildare, Ireland, Chapman code KID
 Kid (poetry collection), a 1992 collection of poems by Simon Armitage
 KID, National Rail station code for Kidderminster railway station in England
 KID, IATA code for Kristianstad Airport, Sweden
 Kids In Danger, working against consumer product hazards to children
 King's Indian Defence, in chess
 Kennebec Intra-District Schools
 Save the Kids token, a cryptocurrency pump and dump scheme which traded as $KIDS

See also 
 The Kid (disambiguation)
 Kidd (disambiguation)
 Kidz (disambiguation)
 Kydd (disambiguation)